Kim Sung-Kyun (born 4 September 1990) is a South Korean football player who plays as a midfielder for South Korean club that K-League side Chunnam Dragons.

Club career
Kim started his football career with Seongnam Ilhwa Chunma. In Seongnam, he played 2 league games and 2 league cup games. After 2009 season, he move to Gangwon FC. In Gangwon, he mostly played in reserve league. he had 6 goals and 1 assist in 2010 R-League. His first K-League match was against Jeju United in Gangneung that lose by 1–4 in home game by substitute on 9 October 2010.

Career statistics

References

External links
 

1990 births
Living people
Association football midfielders
South Korean footballers
Seongnam FC players
Gangwon FC players
Jeonnam Dragons players
K League 1 players